Paulina Borsook is an American technology journalist and writer who has written for Wired, Mother Jones, and Suck.com. She is perhaps best known for her 2000 book Cyberselfish, a critique of the libertarian mindset of the digital technology community. As an artist-in-residence at Stanford University, in 2013 she began work on My Life as a Ghost, an art installation based on her experiences living with the traumatic brain injury she suffered due to a gunshot when she was 14 years old.

Biography
Paulina Borsook was born in Pasadena, California. In 1969, when she was 15, she ran away from home and stayed at Rochdale College in Toronto, Canada. She later attended UC Santa Barbara where she ran a radio show on KCSB. She graduated from UC Berkeley with a degree in psycholinguistics and a minor in philosophy. She then attended graduate school at the University of Arizona before transferring to Columbia University where she earned her MFA.

Beginning in 1981, Borsook took a job at a Marin County, California software company. She later worked for the New York-based Data Communications publication in 1984 before returning to San Francisco in 1987.

Borsook has written extensively about the culture surrounding technology, including Silicon Valley, cypherpunks, bionomics, and technolibertarianism. Her first short story, "Virtual Romance", was nominated for the Pushcart Prize. She became a contributing writer at Wired in the 1990s and her short story about an email romance, "Love Over The Wires", was the first fiction published by the magazine. She has also written for Mother Jones and Suck.com, where she wrote under the name "Justine".

Cyberselfish
Borsook wrote the book Cyberselfish: A Critical Romp Through the Terribly Libertarian Culture of High Tech, which was published by PublicAffairs in 2000. The book was based on an essay that appeared in Mother Jones in 1996 and traces the origins of technolibertarianism. In the book, she characterizes the culture of the digital technology community as predominately libertarian, anti-government, and anti-regulation. Cyberselfish criticized the lack of philanthropy in digital technology circles and questioned how an industry birthed through government funding could be so vehemently anti-government. The book also includes Borsook's experiences as a woman at Wired magazine and in Silicon Valley. Open-source software advocate Eric S. Raymond criticized Borsook's take in an article he wrote for Salon in 2000.

My Life as a Ghost

As a 14-year-old, Borsook suffered a traumatic brain injury (TBI) after being shot in the head. In 2013, after attending a meeting of people with TBI, Borsook realized that some others with TBI had the same experiences of disconnection she had always felt, a "ghostly" feeling that "[s]omething gets dislocated in the sense of knowing that you belong to yourself and your life". From this epiphany, she conceived the project “My Life as a Ghost,” an art installation that combines video, audio, performance, and other media into a built environment to explore "[w]hat happens when the soul is blasted out of the body and is incompletely returned".

She became the first artist in the Stanford Arts Institute’s new Research Residency program, and presented the concept to an audience in October 2013 at Stanford University's Bing Theatre.

Personal life
Borsook is divorced, and lives in Santa Cruz, California. She has advocated for the end of the light brown apple moth eradication programs of the United States Department of Agriculture (USDA) and the California Department of Food and Agriculture (CDFA).

Bibliography

By Paulina Borsook

Books 
 Cyberselfish. a critical romp through the terribly libertarian culture of high tech, PublicAffairs, 2000, 1st ed., 276 p. (Translated into German: Schöne neue Cyberwelt. Mythen, Helden und Irrwege des Hightech, dtv, 2001, translator: Hubert Beck)

References

External links
PaulinaBorsook.com
Cyberselfishness Explained: Interview with Paulina Borsook
My Life as a Ghost

1950s births
Living people
American magazine writers
American technology writers
Columbia University School of the Arts alumni
Writers from Pasadena, California
University of Arizona alumni
University of California, Berkeley alumni
University of California, Santa Barbara alumni
American women non-fiction writers
21st-century American women